Copera rubripes is a species of white-legged damselfly in the family Platycnemididae.

References

Further reading

 

Platycnemididae
Articles created by Qbugbot
Insects described in 1934